This is the list of awards won and nominations received by the American television series Entourage.

Awards

Awards Won
BAFTA Awards:
2006:  Best International Television Series

Emmy Awards:
2006: Outstanding Supporting Actor in a Comedy Series (Jeremy Piven for playing "Ari Gold")
2007: Outstanding Sound Mixing - Comedy or Drama Series and Animation (for "One Day in the Valley")
2007: Outstanding Supporting Actor in a Comedy Series (Jeremy Piven for playing "Ari Gold")
2008: Outstanding Supporting Actor in a Comedy Series (Jeremy Piven for playing "Ari Gold")
2009: Outstanding Sound Mixing - Comedy or Drama Series and Animation (for "Pie")
2010: Outstanding Sound Mixing - Comedy or Drama Series and Animation (for "One Car, Two Car, Red Car, Blue Car")

Golden Globe Awards:
2007: Best Supporting Actor - Mini-Series or TV Film (Jeremy Piven for playing "Ari Gold")

Producers Guild of America:
2005: Producer of the Year - Episodic Comedy

Peabody Award:
2008

Nominations
Directors Guild of America:
2005: Outstanding Directing - Comedy Series (Julian Farino for "Exodus")
2006: Outstanding Directing - Comedy Series (Julian Farino for "One Day in the Valley")
2007: Outstanding Directing - Comedy Series (David Nutter for "The Resurrection")

Emmy Awards:
2005: Outstanding Casting - Comedy Series
2005: Outstanding Directing - Comedy Series (David Frankel for "Pilot")
2005: Outstanding Supporting Actor - Comedy Series (Jeremy Piven for playing "Ari Gold")
2006: Outstanding Casting - Comedy Series 
2006: Outstanding Directing - Comedy Series (Daniel Attias for "Oh, Mandy")
2006: Outstanding Directing - Comedy Series (Julian Farino for "Sundance Kids")
2006: Outstanding Writing - Comedy Series (Doug Ellin for "Exodus")
2007: Outstanding Casting - Comedy Series
2007: Outstanding Directing - Comedy Series (Julian Farino for "One Day in the Valley")
2007: Outstanding Guest Actor - Comedy Series (Martin Landau for playing "Bob Ryan")
2007: Outstanding Comedy Series
2007: Outstanding Supporting Actor - Comedy Series (Kevin Dillon for playing "Johnny Chase")
2008: Outstanding Supporting Actor - Comedy Series (Kevin Dillon for playing "Johnny Chase")
2008: Outstanding Directing - Comedy Series (Dan Attias for "No Cannes Do")
2008: Outstanding Comedy Series
2009: Outstanding Comedy Series
2009: Outstanding Supporting Actor - Comedy Series (Kevin Dillon for playing "Johnny Chase")
2009: Outstanding Directing for a Comedy Series (Julian Farino for "Tree Trippers")

Golden Globe Awards:
2004: Best Series - Musical or Comedy
2004: Best Supporting Actor - Mini-Series or TV Film (Jeremy Piven for playing "Ari Gold")
2005: Best Series - Musical or Comedy 
2005: Best Supporting Actor - Mini-Series or TV Film (Jeremy Piven for playing "Ari Gold")
2006: Best Series - Musical or Comedy 
2006: Best Supporting Actor - Mini-Series or TV Film (Jeremy Piven for playing "Ari Gold")
2007: Best Series - Musical or Comedy 
2007: Best Supporting Actor - Mini-Series or TV Film (Kevin Dillon for playing "Johnny Chase")
2009: Best Series - Musical or Comedy
2009: Best Actor - TV Series - Musical Or Comedy (Kevin Connolly for playing "Eric Murphy")
2009: Best Supporting Actor - Series, Mini-Series or TV Film (Jeremy Piven for playing "Ari Gold")

Image Awards:
2007: Outstanding Directing - Comedy Series (Seith Mann for "Dream Team")

Producers Guild of America:
2007: Producer of the Year - Episodic Comedy

Satellite Awards:
2004: Outstanding Actor - Musical or Comedy Series (Kevin Connolly for playing "Eric Murphy")
2004: Outstanding DVD Release - TV Show (for "Season 1")
2004: Outstanding Series - Musical or Comedy
2005: Best Series - Musical or Comedy
2005: Best Supporting Actor - Mini-Series or TV Film (Jeremy Piven for playing "Ari Gold")

Screen Actors Guild:
2006: Outstanding Actor - Comedy Series (Jeremy Piven for playing "Ari Gold")
2006: Outstanding Cast - Comedy Series
2007: Outstanding Actor - Comedy Series (Jeremy Piven for playing "Ari Gold")
2007: Outstanding Cast - Comedy Series

Slammy Awards:
2015: Celebrity Moment of the Year

Writers Guild of America:
2005: Best Writing - Comedy Series
2006: Best Writing - Comedy Series
2007: Best Writing - Comedy Series

Entourage
Awards